Another Late Night: Kid Loco is a DJ mix album, mixed by Kid Loco. It is the seventh in the Another Late Night / Late Night Tales series.
It was released on 10 February 2003 on Late Night Tales in the UK (catalogue no. ALNCD07).

Track listing
Mizrab - Gábor Szabó
Hard Stuff - The Herbaliser
Ancoats 2 Zambia (Geoff Barrow mix) - The Baby Namboos
Religion I - Public Image Ltd.
Uplink - Stratus
Barcelone - Tommy Hools
Cold Spin - Zero Theory
Fall Break - Aim
Nana Reprise - Frankie Valentine
Tubular Belgian In My Goldfield - Departure Lounge
Summer Love (Beyond There Mix) - Billy Wright
So Blue It's Black (Heavy Manners Mix) - The Underwolves
183 (Head Nod) - DJ Crystl
Top Dog (New version) - Markus Kienzl
Wade In Water - Harvey Mandel
Lilly Hall - Kraze One & Aniis Le Neve
The Domino Boys - Up, Bustle & Out
Street Preacher - Troublemakers
Spooked - Flevans
Paralysed - Kid Loco
Attitude - Marie et Les Garcons
Rashida - Jon Lucien
Peepshow - written by Nick Walker, read by Sir Patrick Moore

References

Kid Loco
2003 compilation albums